Rubus domingensis is a Caribbean species of brambles in the rose family. It has been found only in the Dominican Republic.

Rubus domingensis is a climbing perennial up to 3 meters tall. Leaves are compound with 3 thick, leathery leaflets. Flowers are white. Fruits are black.

Etymology
The species has been given the specific epithet "domingensis", as it occurs on the island of Hispaniola. This island was historically called Santo Domingo, or Saint-Domingue.

References

domingensis
Endemic flora of the Dominican Republic
Plants described in 1890